Ganish (also Ganesh) is a village in the Hunza District of Pakistan. It is the oldest and first settlement on the ancient Silk Road in the Hunza Valley, and is the site of various ancient watchtowers, traditional mosques, religious centers, and a reservoir. It is located 90  km and 2.5 hours traveling time from Gilgit. Meaning of the word "Ganish" is unknown but according to local scholars, it is derived from the Burushaski word "Genish", meaning gold. Ganish has been a major town for travelers since the days of the Silk Road - now Karakorum Highway.

UNESCO awards 

Ganish is home to four mosques - the Ganish Mosques - that are 300–400 years old. They were awarded UNESCO Heritage Award for Culture Heritage Conservation in 2002.

The Ali Gohar House in Ganish, is located next to one of the iconic shikari watchtowers of the town. A few watchtowers have survived the harsh weather and collapse due to sliding towards South East. The fortified settlement has 40 feet Tamurkux watchtower which was used in the past for the surveillance of surroundings especially at nights. The settlement used to be at a high risk of attacks and looting because of its location along the ancient Silk Road. The 400-year-old house was awarded the UNESCO Asia-Pacific Awards for Cultural Heritage Conservation in 2009.

Administration
The sub-villages of Ganish include Garelth, Chaboikushal, Shukunoshal, Gamun Ganish, Buldas and Tsillganish.

 "Gamun Ganish is the center of the village with a population of around 5000. The Yadgar Chowk is where all the locals meet to discuss matters of the town. 

Chaboikushal is a sub-village of Ganish. This small village is located right in the heart of Hunza Valley. There are about 25 houses or families. Chaboikushal was derived from Chaboi, the grandfather of Sheril. According to old men in the village, Chaboi was migrated from Iran, where he had two sons: Helo and Melo. Melo remained and was raised in Chaboikushal and Helo migrated to Nagar valley. The one who resided in this village was one of the bravest persons of his times, hardworking and the closest to King of Hunza.

Tsillganish is a sub-village of Ganish. There are 25 families living here. Tsillganish is one of the most ancient villages of Ganish which has a rich history. The residents of Tsillganish belong to the well-known tribe Tsillganishkuz. The word Tsill means water and Ganiskuz means residents of Ganish. Sheikh Ali was a prominent cleric in Tsillganish and Haji Muhammad Bilal (late) was the main leader from the area who was also the first Haji (pilgrim of Ka'ba) from Hunza. Jamia tul Zehra is the main institution for education in Tsillganish. Qadimi Imambargarh is rich in its artwork carried out by the artisans of ancient times. The wood carving work of the Imambargah is known for its beauty. 

Garelth is also a sub-village of Ganish with a population of about 135 families. FG Boys Middle School, Aga Khan Diamond School are the main educational institutions. Former Member District Council Gilgit Baltistan Jan Alam, Former Chairman Village Council Darvesh, and Muhammad Ali Barcha have been leading politically. Currently, Ghulam Mustafa Barcha, grandson of Major Ghulam Murtaza is Chairman of Garelth Hunza.

Subedar Major Fida Ali, one of the main leaders of the independence movement of Gilgit-Baltistan, belongs to this village. Fida Ali played a key role in the independence of Gilgit-Baltistan. He was a key figure who launched the freedom movement against the Dogra dynasty in Gilgit. Major Ghulam Murtaza (Sitara-e-Jurat), a key person in the revolution of the independence movement of Gilgit-Baltistan, also belongs to this village. He made major gains by leading troops into India. His graveyard is located next to KKH at Garelth.

See also 
Karimabad
Altit
Hunza Princely State

References

External links
 Heritageofhunza.blogspot.com
 Karakorumexplorers.com.pk

Populated places in Hunza District